Michael de Avila (also known as Mike D) is an American television personality, filmmaker, and producer from New York, New York.  He is the host of the fishing television show Lunkerville, which airs on the World Fishing Network. and NBC Sports Network.

Lunkerville is a CINE Golden Eagle award winner and Mike was chosen Viewer Favorite Host in 2004 by Sportsman Channel Viewers. Mike was also featured in a New York Post article in 2007 when he took a reporter fishing in Central Park, New York City.

Mike D is also a filmmaker who has directed two feature-length dramatic films: the theatrically released "Lost Prophet" and the Sundance Channel premiere film "Burnzy's Last Call".

Sources 

1965 births
Living people
American fishers
American television personalities
Male television personalities